Broderbund Software, Inc. (stylized as Brøderbund) was an American maker of video games, educational software, and productivity tools. Broderbund is best known for the 8-bit video game hits Choplifter, Lode Runner, Karateka, and Prince of Persia (all of which originated on the Apple II), as well as The Print Shop—originally for printing signs and banners on dot matrix printers—and the Myst and Carmen Sandiego games. The company was founded in Eugene, Oregon, and moved to San Rafael, California, then later to Novato, California. Brøderbund was purchased by SoftKey in 1998.

Many of Broderbund's software titles, such as The Print Shop, PrintMaster, and Mavis Beacon, are still published under the name "Brøderbund". Games released by the revived Broderbund are distributed by Encore, Inc. Brøderbund is now the brand name for Riverdeep's graphic design, productivity, and edutainment titles such as The Print Shop, Carmen Sandiego, Mavis Beacon Teaches Typing, the Living Books series, and Reader Rabbit titles, in addition to publishing software for other companies, notably Zone Labs' ZoneAlarm.

The company would often release school editions of their games, which contained extra features to allow teachers to use the software to facilitate students' learning.

Etymology
The word "brøderbund" is not an actual word in any language but is a somewhat loose translation of "band of brothers" into a mixture of Danish, Dutch, German, and Swedish. The "ø" in "brøderbund" was used partially as a play on the letter ø from the Dano-Norwegian alphabet but was mainly referencing the slashed zero found in mainframes, terminals, and early personal computers. The three crowns above the logo are also a reference to the lesser national coat of arms of Sweden.

The company's name is pronounced  instead of the popularly used .

History

Brøderbund was founded by brothers Doug and Gary Carlston in 1980 for the purpose of marketing Galactic Empire, a strategy computer game that Doug Carlston had created in 1979. Before founding the company, Doug was a lawyer and Gary had held several jobs, including teaching Swedish at an American college. Their sister Cathy joined the company a year later from Lord & Taylor. Galactic Empire had many names taken from African languages; a group of merchants was named Broederbond, Afrikaans for "association of brothers". To emphasize its family origin while avoiding a connection with the ethnonationalist Afrikaner organization of the same name, the Carlstons altered the spelling when naming their company "Brøderbund".

By 1982, Brøderbund produced arcade games which, the company told Jerry Pournelle, sold much better than strategy games. Burr, Egan, Deleage & Co. invested in the company that year. In 1983, the Carlstons publicly discussed their plans to emphasize home utility software (Bank Street Writer and other "Bank Street" applications), computer literacy with The Jim Henson Company, and edutainment. By early 1984 InfoWorld estimated that Brøderbund was tied with Human Engineered Software as the world's tenth-largest microcomputer-software company and largest entertainment-software company, with $13 million in 1983 sales. That year it took over the assets of the well-regarded but financially troubled Synapse Software. Although intending to keep it running as a business, they were unable to make money from Synapse's products, and closed it down after a year.

Brøderbund's The Print Shop software produced signs and greeting cards. Brøderbund started discussions with Unison World about creating an MS-DOS version. The two companies could not agree on a contract, but Unison World developed a product with similar function and a similar user interface. Broderbund sued for infringement of their copyright. Brøderbund v. Unison (1986) became a landmark case in establishing that the look and feel of a software product could be subject to copyright protection.

Sierra On-Line and Broderbund ended merger discussions in March 1991. By that year Brøderbund had about $50 million in revenue, and 25% share of the education market. Carmen Sandiego had been its first internally developed product, but the company now developed most of its software; Doug Carlston stated that Brøderbund needed "to control our own sources, to control our future". After an unsuccessful initial public offering in 1987, the company executed a private placement for 20% of shares with Jostens. Broderbund became a public company in November 1991 with the NASDAQ symbol BROD. When it went public The Print Shop comprised 33% of total revenue, and the Carmen Sandiego series 26%. Brøderbund stock price and market capitalization climbed to $72.50 per share in September 1995, and then fell steadily because of continued losses for several years.

Brøderbund acquired PC Globe in July 1992. It had initially attempted to purchase the original The Learning Company in 1995, but was outbid by SoftKey, who purchased The Learning Company for $606 million in cash and then adopted its name. The company then bought Brøderbund in 1998 for about US$420 million in stock and, to rationalize costs, it terminated five hundred employees at Brøderbund the same year (representing 42% of the company's workforce). Doug Carlston explained that in a bid to roll up Broderbund, SoftKey utilised one of their previous acquisitions to weaken the company's stronghold over the industry. They allegedly gave a rebate to Mindscape's PrintMaster, a direct competitor to Brøderbund's Print Shop, that was more than the product was worth. In 1998, Broderbund inked a deal with Nickelodeon to develop CD-ROM games based on its animated cartoons, such as Rugrats.

In 1999, the combined company was purchased by Mattel for $3.6 billion. Mattel reeled from the financial impact of this transaction, and Jill E. Barad, the CEO, ended up being forced out in a climate of investor outrage. Mattel sold their game division Mattel Interactive as well as all its assets in September 2000 to Gores Technology Group, a private acquisitions firm, for a share of whatever Gores could obtain by selling the company. During this time, Brøderbund products were owned by The Learning Company Deutschland GmbH, located in Oberhaching, Germany. Headed by Jean-Pierre Nordmann, the company was a subsidiary of The Learning Company (formerly SoftKey), which itself was a wholly owned subsidiary of Gores Technology Group. The company published games under two logos: Blue (Brøderbund) and Red (The Learning Company). The "Brøderbund" label was used for "high-quality infotainment, design and lifestyle titles such as Cosmopolitan My Style 2 and PrintMaster", while "The Learning Company" label was used for children's software.

In 2001, Gores sold The Learning Company's entertainment holdings to Ubi Soft, and most of the other holdings, including the Brøderbund name, to Irish company Riverdeep. Many of Broderbund's games, such as the Myst series, are published by Ubisoft. The Brøderbund line of products is published by Encore, Inc. under license from Riverdeep. Under the terms of the agreement, Encore now manages the Broderbund family of products as well as Brøderbund's direct to consumer business. In May 2010 Encore acquired the assets of Punch! Software.

In 2014, Doug Carlston donated a collection of Brøderbund's business records, software, and a collection of games that includes Myst, Prince of Persia, and Where in the World is Carmen Sandiego? to The Strong National Museum of Play. The Strong National Museum of Play forwarded the collection to the ICHEG museum for preservation.

As of 2017, Houghton Mifflin Harcourt is offering the Brøderbund, The Print Shop, Calendar Creator, and ClickArt brands for licensing.

Products

Brøderbund scored an early hit with the game Galactic Empire, written by Doug Carlston for the TRS-80. The company's first title for the Apple II, Tank Command, was written by the third Carlston brother, Professor Donal Carlston.

The company became a powerhouse in the educational and entertainment software markets with titles like Fantavision, Choplifter, Apple Panic, Lode Runner, Karateka, Wings of Fury, Prince of Persia, Where in the World is Carmen Sandiego?, The Guardian Legend, and Myst, which stayed the highest grossing home video game for years. 
Brøderbund became one of the most dominant publishers in the computer market of the 1980s, releasing video games for virtually all major computer systems in the United States. Like most early computer gaming developers, Brøderbund began as an Apple II-focused company and began expanding to other platforms as time went along. They released IBM PC ports of a few games very early on, however, it was not until after 1985 that Broderbund would seriously develop for PC compatibles. Due to their strong focus on education titles, they were one of a few developers to actively support the Apple IIGS in the late 1980s. Some of the more popular Broderbund titles were licensed to Western European and Japanese developers and ported to systems in those regions. During the 1990s, Brøderbund mostly concentrated on educational titles for PCs and Macintoshes with a few forays into RPGs and strategy games.

Brøderbund published the Print Shop series of desktop publishing making programs; Family Tree Maker (a genealogy program supported by hundreds of CDs of public genealogy data); 3D Home Architect, a program for designing and visualizing family homes; and Banner Mania, a program for designing and printing multi-page banners. By the end of the 1980s, games represented only a few percent of Broderbund's annual sales, which by then were heavily focused in the productivity arena and early education and learning areas.

Just before being acquired by The Learning Company (formerly SoftKey), Brøderbund spun off its Living Books series by forming a joint venture with Random House Publishing. Despite the success and quality of the Living Books series, the joint venture was only marginally successful and was dissolved with The Learning Company deal.

For a brief time, Brøderbund was involved in the video game console market when it published a few games for the Nintendo Entertainment System (NES) through its New Ventures Division. All of Brøderbund's games for the NES, including the port of its own franchises Lode Runner, Spelunker, and Raid on Bungeling Bay, were developed by third-party Japanese companies. Brøderbund published some titles that were produced by companies that didn't have a North American subsidiary, such as Irem's Deadly Towers, Compile's The Guardian Legend, Imagineer's The Battle of Olympus, and Legacy of the Wizard, the fourth installment in Nihon Falcom's Dragon Slayer series. Brøderbund also developed and marketed an ill-fated motion sensitive NES controller device called the U-Force, which was operated without direct physical contact between the player and the device. Broderbund also served as distributing agent of Irem's North American NES release of Sqoon, because Irem didn't yet have its own American operation. In 1990, Broderbund sold its New Ventures Division, including manufacturing equipment, inventory, and assets, to then-fledgling company THQ.

Brøderbund released in the United States Arsys Software's 1986 third-person action RPG shooter WiBArm.

Brøderbund briefly had a board game division, which published Don Carlston's Personal Preference, along with several board game versions of its video games.

See also

 List of companies based in Oregon
 Red Orb Entertainment — Broderbund's game publishing division, later supported by Mindscape

References

External links
 
 Profile at MobyGames

Houghton Mifflin Harcourt
 
Defunct video game companies of the United States
Video game development companies
Video game publishers
Software companies based in Oregon
Software companies based in the San Francisco Bay Area
Defunct companies based in the San Francisco Bay Area
Video game companies established in 1980
Video game companies disestablished in 1998
Mattel
Software companies established in 1980
Software companies disestablished in 1998
1980 establishments in California
1998 disestablishments in California
Companies based in San Rafael, California
Companies based in Marin County, California
Novato, California
Companies based in Eugene, Oregon
1998 mergers and acquisitions